The McCollum-Chidester House is a historic house at 926 Washington Street NW in Camden, Arkansas.  It is now a museum operated by the Ouachita County Historical Society, along with the Leake-Ingham Building at the rear of the property.  The -story wood-frame house was built in 1847 by Peter McCollum and sold ten years later to Colonel John T. Chidester.  It is one of the finest pre-Civil War Greek Revival mansions in the state.  Chidester was a prominent businessman who controversially sought to do business with Union interests during the Civil War.  After the war he established a mail company that operated so-called "Star routes" as far west as the Arizona Territory.  He was not implicated in bribery scandals that attended this operation.

The house was listed on the National Register of Historic Places in 1971.

See also
National Register of Historic Places listings in Ouachita County, Arkansas

References

External links
Ouachita County Historical Society web site

1847 establishments in Arkansas
Arkansas Heritage Trails System
Buildings and structures in Camden, Arkansas
Greek Revival houses in Arkansas
Individually listed contributing properties to historic districts on the National Register in Arkansas
Historic house museums in Arkansas
Houses completed in 1847
Houses in Ouachita County, Arkansas
Houses on the National Register of Historic Places in Arkansas
Museums in Ouachita County, Arkansas
National Register of Historic Places in Ouachita County, Arkansas